Scytl Election Technologies S.L.U. (also stylized SCYTL) is a Spanish provider of electronic voting systems and election technology. Founded in 2001 in Barcelona, its products and services are used in elections and referendums across the world.

Scytl is owned by Innovative Solutions Ecosystem, S.A (Paragon Group) . Scytl is one of the largest election services companies, as is its competitor Dominion Voting Systems.

History
Scytl was founded in 2001, and grew out of a cryptography research project at the Autonomous University of Barcelona. The name is a reference to the scytale, an ancient cryptographic tool.

It became profitable in 2006, and in 2014, it reported 70% annual revenue growth. It bought SOE Software in 2012. It intended to go public in 2016, but delayed the IPO because of poor performance in developing markets and decided to focus on developed country markets as well as on election solutions for non-government customers.

In 2017, Scytl reported having 600 employees, of which a third were in Barcelona. In 2016, it divided itself into three companies:
the original Scytl Secure Electronic Voting, which develops voting software, 
Scytl Voting Hardware SL, which develops voting hardware, owned by Scytl and an anonymous Dubai-based investor, and
Civiti (formerly OpenSeneca), which focuses on civic participation services.

The company's systems have been implemented in numerous countries, but problems have cropped up over the years in some of its solutions and voting systems, including those used in Australia, Ecuador, Norway and Switzerland.

Investors
Scytl was funded by venture capital. It raised $9 million in 2006 from investors including Balderton Capital and Nauta Capital, and $104 million in 2014 in multiple funding rounds from investors including Vulcan Capital, Sapphire Ventures, Vy Capital, Adams Street Partners and Industry Ventures. Paul Allen (co-founder of Microsoft with Bill Gates) invested $40 million in 2014.

Acquisitions and cooperations
In 2012, Scytl acquired the American company SOE Software ("Supervisors of Elections"),located in Tampa. SOE implemented Scytl technologies in the United States.

In 2013 Scytl acquired the software division of Gov2U, a company partnered with the National Democratic Institute.

Scytl became a partner of Amazon Web Services by November 2018. They host their services on Amazon's cloud platform.

2020 bankruptcy and recovery
On 11 May 2020, facing debts of over €75 million, Scytl initiated bankruptcy proceedings with a view to selling its business to the U.S. investment fund Sandton Capital. On 2 June 2020, a Spanish court declared Scytl bankrupt and started the process of auctioning off its assets.

In late October, the Paragon Group subsidiary "Service Point Solutions" (from december 2021, Innovative Solutions Ecosystem "ISE") acquired Scytl including its U.S. subsidiary SOE.

Products
Scytl's products covered the entire election process, including election planning, online voter registration, poll worker management, electronic ballot delivery, online voting, results consolidation and election night reporting.

Customers
In 2014, Scytl reported having customers in more than 35 countries. Their products have been used in the following jurisdictions, among others:

Australia
In 2018, the authorities of New South Wales selected Scytl to provide the software for the state's "iVote" online voting system until 2022 for $1.9 million.  The iVote system is an internet and telephone voting solution that allows persons with disabilities and voters with accessibility problems to vote remotely. During the 2015 election, researchers uncovered vulnerabilities in the iVote system which could be used to manipulate votes, violate ballot privacy and subvert the verification mechanism. However, in a public statement, the NSW Electoral Commission clarified that the vulnerability was not related to the online voting system but to the publicly accessible SSL certificate on the Piwik website, the web analytics tool used by the Commission.

Ecuador 
Scytl ran voting machines in several parts of Ecuador in 2014. They were supposed to produce results within 72 hours, but ran into a variety of problems and took over a month.

European Union
In 2014, a consortium created by Scytl and TNS opinion provided real-time electoral projections and results consolidation and dissemination across the 28 EU Member States for the European Parliament Elections held on May 22–25, 2014. The consortium collected and processed election results from all Member States providing a multi-lingual website in 24 official languages for the publication and dissemination of the European parliament election results.

Malta
Scytl and idox provide the Maltese "eCount" electronic vote counting system that is to be used beginning in 2019.

Norway 
Scytl deployed electronic voting in Norway in 2011 in partnership with the government. A flaw in their cryptography was discovered in 2013, and 0.75% of all voters managed to vote twice in 2013, once online and once in a polling station.

In 2014 Norway abandoned Scytl's Internet Voting project, due to security failures, lack of increase in turnout, and high costs.

Russia
By autumn 2012, Scytl had partnered with Yopolis, a company started by Maxim Nogotkov as the first online participation platform in the Russian Federation. Scytl was to provide security verifying integrity of Yopolis municipal voting. Pere Valles attended the launch event in Moscow while serving as CEO of the company, prior to being chairman of the board of directors in April 2018.

Spain 
Scytl partnered with Tecnocom to provide results consolidation and publication technology in the 2015 Spanish General elections. In May 2019, Scytl will partner with Vector ITC to consolidate and publish the preliminary results of the municipal and European elections in Spain.

Switzerland
In a joint venture with Swiss Post, Scytl provides its sVote e-voting system to several cantons that allow Swiss citizens who live abroad to take part in cantonal and federal elections and referendums electronically. After the Canton of Geneva decided in 2018 to abandon the continued development of its own e-voting system, Swiss Post and Scytl remained the only e-voting providers then certified to provide e-voting services in Switzerland by the Swiss Federal Chancellery.

Scytl said its sVote system used in Switzerland is "universally verifiable", but its system has been criticized as overly complex, difficult to audit and not sufficiently transparent. After Swiss authorities launched a public code review, a group of researchers of the University of Melbourne, Université catholique de Louvain, and the Open Privacy Research Society reported in March 2019 that they discovered a deficiency in the leaked version of the source-code that would allow the system's operator to alter votes undetected. Additionally, the Swiss security research group setuid(0) released several vulnerabilities in cooperation with the Swiss Post, including an issue where a system operator could execute arbitrary code on the e-voting servers.  Because of the deficiencies, Swiss authorities disallowed the use of Scytl's e-voting system in the Swiss referendums of 19 May 2019, and it has not been used since. Swiss Post purchased the rights to the software from Scytl in 2020 as the company faced bankruptcy.

United States
In the 2016 United States elections, Scytl's technologies were used statewide in 12 U.S. states, and in another 980 local jurisdictions in 28 states.

After President Donald Trump's defeat in the 2020 United States presidential election, his attorney Sidney Powell repeated an allegation made by One America News Network, Congressman Louis Gohmert and others that accurate voting results had been transmitted to a Scytl office in Germany, where they were supposedly tabulated to reveal a landslide victory for Trump, and that a company server had been seized in a raid by the United States Army. Scytl denied the allegations and the Army stated the raid allegation was false. Scytl affirmed having an office in Frankfurt, stating it was closed in September 2019. The company also denied allegations that it had ties to Russia or George Soros.

Recognition
The company received positive reviews from Ovum Ltd. in 2013.

References

External links 

2001 establishments in Spain
Information technology companies of Spain
Electronic voting companies
Election technology companies